is the feminine form of the French word , meaning "The Austrian". It may refer to:

A derogatory nickname for Queen Marie Antoinette of France
L'Autrichienne (film), a 1990 French film on Marie Antoinette with Ute Lemper
L'Autrichienne (Jucifer album), 2008

See also

 Autrichien, a variety of grape, a wine grape cultivar
 
 
 Austrian (disambiguation)
 Chien (disambiguation)